Taxiarches or its variant taxiarchos (from ), anglicized taxiarch, may refer to:

 Taxiarch, equivalent to brigadier in ancient and modern Greek military terminology
 Archangels Michael and Gabriel are called the Taxiarchs in Greek Orthodoxy because they lead the heavenly host

Places 
Several places in Greece are named after the archangels, either in singular, Taxiarchis, or in plural, Taxiarches (Ταξιάρχες):

Taxiarches, Attica
Taxiarchis, Aetolia-Acarnania
Taxiarches, Achaea
Taxiarchis, Grevena
Taxiarchis, Chalkidiki
Taxiarchis, Euboea
Taxiarches, Drama
Taxiarches, Elis
Taxiarchis, Euboea
Taxiarchis, Lesbos
Taxiarches, Trikala